is a Ryukyuan gusuku in Nago, Okinawa. It was built in the 14th century and served as the home of the Aji of Nago Magiri. In 1416, the army of Chūzan, led by Shō Hashi, attacked and captured the castle during the invasion of Hokuzan.

References

External links
One reference
 Nago Castle

Castles in Okinawa Prefecture